Daniel Lind-Ramos (born 1953) is an African-Puerto Rican painter and sculptor who lives and works in Puerto Rico.

Life
Lind-Ramos was born in 1953 in Loíza, a coastal town in Puerto Rico. He studied painting at the University of Puerto Rico in 1975 and in 1980 he graduated from NYU with a master’s of art degree. In addition to his studio practice, Lind-Ramos also currently teaches in the Humanities Department at the University of Puerto Rico at Humacao.

Artistic practice

Lind-Ramos paints on canvas with oil using traditional and uncommon applications techniques from brushes to spatulas. He also works with recycled or reused materials such as cardboard, wire screen, discarded appliances, car parts, the foliage of coconut palm trees, broken musical instruments and other used items.

He was described as the "breakout star" or highlight of the 2019 Whitney Biennial by multiple reviewers, with the New York Times writing that his sculpture Maria Maria exemplified the pieces in the Biennial that "reassert the power of spirituality." Critic Holland Cotter elaborated on the sculpture, explaining how Lind-Ramos "creat[ed] from wood, beads, coconuts and a blue FEMA tarp, a figure that is both the Virgin Mary and personification of the hurricane that devastated the island in 2017 ... the piece looks presidingly majestic."

His works are in the permanent collections of the Museum of Latin American Art, El Museo del Barrio, and the Puerto Rico Museum of Contemporary Art.

Exhibitions 
Some of Lind-Ramos' exhibitions include:
 Fundación Arana Scholarship (1989) - funded Lind-Ramos to study in Paris, France for one year with Antonio Seguí’s Studio at the Ecole des Beaux Arts
 Salon International Val D’or at Hyères (1990) - First Prize
 Salón Internacional de Plástica Latina at Meillant, France (2000) - Delegation Prize
 World Festival of Black Culture and Arts in Dakar, Senegal, Africa (2010) - Invitation
 Second Gran Bienal Tropical (2016) at Piñones, Puerto Rico - Piña de oro
Whitney Biennial 2019, Whitney Museum of American Art, New York, NY - curated by Rujeko Hockley and Jane Panetta

Awards
In 2021, Lind-Ramos was awarded the MacArthur Fellowship.

References

External links
Artist's Web Site
Daniel Lind Ramos and the Visual Politics of Race in Puerto Rican Art
DANIEL LIND RAMOS - Enciclopedia Puerto Rico
Daniel Lind Ramos - Museo de Arte de Puerto Rico

Puerto Rican painters
Puerto Rican artists
Puerto Rican sculptors
People of Afro–Puerto Rican descent
African-American painters
People from Loíza, Puerto Rico
Living people
1953 births
University of Puerto Rico alumni
New York University alumni
African-American sculptors
21st-century African-American people
20th-century African-American people